Teresa Mara Levis (June 6, 1923 – October 1, 1999), better known as Teresa Celli, was an American actress who was known for her work in films such as The Asphalt Jungle (1950) and Black Hand (1950).

Celli was born in June 1923 as Teresa Levis in Dysart, Pennsylvania. She was one of ten children born to an Italian family. When her father inherited an estate in Italy, the family moved there. Her grandmother, Maria Scagnet, and her great-grandmother, Mme. Duval Celli, both sang opera, and it was from the latter that Teresa took her professional last name.

While she lived in Italy, Celli was a student of soprano Ersilde Cervi Caroli, and she became active in both opera and dramatic productions.

Celli's American radio debut occurred March 5, 1949, on the NBC program Star Theater with Frank Sinatra.

Celli's film debut came in Border Incident (1949).

She was the first wife of actor Barry Nelson, being married to him from 1951 to 1965. Celli died in October 1999 at the age of 76.

References

External links

1923 births
1999 deaths
Actresses from Pennsylvania
American film actresses
American radio actresses
20th-century American actresses